Alvin Foye Sortwell (July 21, 1854 – March 21, 1910) was a Massachusetts politician who served as the twenty-sixth Mayor of Cambridge, Massachusetts.

Sortwell was born to Daniel Robinson Sortwell and Sophia Augusta (Foye) Sortwell in Boston, Massachusetts, on July 21, 1854. On December 31, 1879, Sortwell married Gertrude Winship Dailey, they had six children, Clara, Frances Augusta, Daniel Richard, Marion, Edward Carter and Alvin Foye Sortwell.  Edward Carter Sortwell joined the American Ambulance Field Service, Edward died in Salonika, Greece in November 1916 the result of being struck by a staff car while crossing a darkened alleyway.

Notes

1854 births
1910 deaths
Mayors of Cambridge, Massachusetts
Massachusetts city council members
19th-century American politicians